Blood Will Tell is a 1917 American silent drama film directed by Charles Miller and starring William Desmond, Enid Markey and David Hartford. The film's sets were designed by the art director Robert Brunton.

Cast
 William Desmond as Samson Oakley III
 Enid Markey as Nora North
 David Hartford as Samson Oakley II
 Howard Hickman as James Black
 Margaret Thompson as Dixie Du Fresne
 Charles Gunn as Otis Slade
 J. Frank Burke as Aaron Howlett
 J. Barney Sherry as Dr. Galbraith
 Fanny Midgley as Mrs. Oakley

References

Bibliography
 Robert B. Connelly. The Silents: Silent Feature Films, 1910-36, Volume 40, Issue 2. December Press, 1998.

External links
 

1917 films
1917 drama films
1910s English-language films
American silent feature films
Silent American drama films
American black-and-white films
Triangle Film Corporation films
Films directed by Charles Miller
1910s American films